The Lakenvelder  or Lakenfelder is a breed of domestic chicken from the Nordrhein-Westfalen area of Germany and neighbouring areas of the Netherlands. It was first recorded in 1727.

History 

The origins of the Lakenvelder are not clear. Two different histories are proposed: it may have originated in Holland, where it is documented from 1727, and its name may derive from that of the village of Lakerveld, in the municipality of Zederik in South Holland. They came to be known as Lakenvelder, and enjoyed considerable popularity until the arrival in the later nineteenth century of more productive imported breeds such as the Leghorn, after which numbers declined rapidly.

The Lakenvelder was first imported into Britain in 1901, and was shown in Shrewsbury in 1902. In the United States, it was admitted to the Standard of Perfection of the American Poultry Association in 1939.

The international conservation status of the Lakenvelder was not listed as being at risk by the FAO in 2007; in Germany, it is listed in category III,  ("extremely endangered") on the Rote Liste of the Gesellschaft zur Erhaltung alter und gefährdeter Haustierrassen.

Characteristics 

The head, neck hackle and tail of the Lakenvelder are solid black, without spots, ticks or stripes; the inner web of the wing primaries and secondaries is black. The rest of the bird is white with a pale blue-grey under-colour. The black-and-white pattern is reminiscent of the colouring of the Lakenvelder breed of cattle, which originated in the same area.

The eyes are bright chestnut or red, the beak dark horn, and the face, wattles and comb bright red, with white earlobes. The legs are slate-blue.

Use 

The Lakenvelder lays up to 160 white eggs, weighing up to 50 g each, per year.

References

Conservation Priority Breeds of the Livestock Conservancy
Chicken breeds
Chicken breeds originating in Germany
Animal breeds on the GEH Red List